Following the 1937 Bombay Presidency elections, Indian National Congress emerged as the largest group in the Bombay Legislative Assembly. However, when its leader B. G. Kher refused to form a government, Governor Lord Brabourne instead invited Dhanjishah Cooper, an independent member from Satara, to be the Presidency's prime minister on 1 April 1937. Cooper accepted and thus, became's Bombay's first prime minister. The four-member ministry he formed shortly resigned due to lack of majority support, and was replaced by Kher's ministry in July 1937.

Government formation
Indian National Congress had secured highest seats in the 1937 elections. However, the party refused to form a government due to disagreements over the Governor's reserve powers as envisioned by the Government of India Act, 1935. After Congress' B. G. Kher refused his mandate, the Governor invited the second-largest Muslim League. Citing that the League would be unable to maintain a stable majority, Ali Muhammad Khan Dehlavi refused office as well.

After either party had refused, the Governor invited Cooper to take up premiership. Cooper tried establishing a government of non-Congress parties, including Muslim League and Democratic Swarajya Party.

List of ministers
Cooper's ministry had four cabinet ministers.

References

1937 in India
C
Cabinets established in 1937
Cabinets disestablished in 1937
Bombay Presidency